Denise Grey (born Édouardine Verthuy; 17 September 1896 – 13 January 1996) was an Italian-born actress who became a naturalized French citizen.

Biography

Édouardine Grey was born in Châtillon in the Aosta Valley of north-west Italy, close to the French border. The town at the time primarily spoke the Valdôtain dialect. She was naturalized as a French citizen on 13 July 1922. She started working in the film industry in 1915 in the silent film En famille, an adaptation of the novel by Hector Malot, before dedicating herself to theatre work. She went back to working in films, now talkies, in the 1930s. She came to fame in the 1940s with films such as Monsieur Hector (1940), Boléro (1942) or Devil in the Flesh (1947). Old age did not end her career. For example, in 1972, she starred in a French television series called Les Rois maudits. Thanks to the film La Boum, in which she plays "Poupette", the great-grandmother of Sophie Marceau, she gained recognition from a new audience growing up in the 1980s. In 1986, she sang Devenir vieux (Becoming Old). 

She was a member of the Comédie-Française between 1944 and 1946 and between 1957 and 1958.

Personal life
She had a daughter: Suzanne Grey, also an actress, who was born on 28 June 1917 and died on 13 December 2005.

Death
She died in 1996, a few months before reaching the age of 100. She rests next to her husband in the cemetery of Arradon (Morbihan).

Selected filmography 
 Serge Panine (1939)
 Monsieur Hector (1940)
 The Blue Veil (1942)
 Bolero (1942)
 Goodbye Leonard (1943)
 Majestic Hotel Cellars (1945)
 The Ideal Couple (1946)
 Strange Fate (1946)
Coincidences (1947)
 Devil in the Flesh (1947)
 Blonde (1950)
 Rome Express (1950)
 Article 519, Penal Code (1952)
 The Tour of the Grand Dukes (1953)
 The Father of the Girl (1953)
 The Pirates of the Bois de Boulogne (1954)
 The Sheep Has Five Legs (1954)
 Rasputin (1954)
 Poisson d'avril (1954)
 Il seduttore (1954)
 Spring, Autumn and Love (1955)
 It's All Adam's Fault (1958)
 Bombs on Monte Carlo (1960)
 Les Rois maudits (1972)
 La boum (1980)
 A Fine Romance (1991)

References

1896 births
1996 deaths
People from Aosta Valley
Italian emigrants to France
Naturalized citizens of France
French stage actresses
French film actresses
French silent film actresses
French television actresses
Troupe of the Comédie-Française
Officers of the Ordre national du Mérite
20th-century French actresses